The 2022–23 season is ASFAR's 63th successive season in the Botola, and 64th season in existence. In addition to the domestic league, they are participating in this season's Throne Cup, and CAF Confederation Cup.

Background
After finishing 3rd in the 2021–22 Botola campaign, AS FAR secured a spot in the first round of the CAF Confederation Cup. However, in early August, Belgian manager Sven Vandenbroeck left the club to sign for Saudi Arabian club Abha Club. French manager Fernando Da Cruz replaced him one month later.

Season Squad

Transfers

Released

Loans in

Loans out

Transfers in

Transfers out

References

AS FAR (football)
2022–23 in Moroccan football
Moroccan football club seasons